Roberto Valero (1955 – September 23, 1994) was a  Cuban poet, novelist, and educator.

Life 
Roberto Valero was born in Matanzas Province.  He attended the University of Havana before leaving Cuba during the Mariel Boatlift in 1980.

He received his Ph.D. from Georgetown University and taught at George Washington University.

Along with Reinaldo Arenas and Reinaldo Garcia Ramos, Valero created the seminal Mariel journal.

He was the 1989 recipient of the Letras de Oro Literary Prize from the University of Miami for his book on Reinaldo Arenas.

Valero's work has been compared to that of Federico García Lorca.

Valero also published under the pseudonym of "Julio Real".

Writings

Poetry
 Desde un oscuro ángulo/From a Dark Angle (1982)
 En fin, la noche/At Last, the Night (1984)
 Dharma (1985) with an introduction by Eugenio Florit
 Venías/You Were Coming (1990)
 No estaré en tu camino/I Will Not Be On Your Path (1991)

Novels
 Este Viento De Cuaresma/This Lenten Wind (1994) with an introduction by Reinaldo Arenas

Criticiscm
 El Desamparado Humor De Reinaldo Arenas/The Homeless Humor of Reinaldo Arenas (1991)

See also

 List of Cuban American writers

References

Further reading 
English
 Tyranny and Myth (Library of Congress archived reading by Valero) / 1993

External links 
 Beltway Poetry Quarterly article on Valero and Arenas
 Encyclopædia Britannica profile for Roberto Valero

1955 births
1994 deaths
American magazine editors
American writers of Cuban descent
American male poets
Cuban exiles
20th-century Cuban novelists
20th-century Cuban poets
Cuban male novelists
Cuban refugees
George Washington University faculty
LGBT Hispanic and Latino American people
Hispanic and Latino American poets
Hispanic and Latino American novelists
20th-century American novelists
20th-century American poets
Poets from Washington, D.C.
Cuban expatriates in the United States
American male novelists
American male non-fiction writers
Cuban male poets
20th-century American male writers